Euripedes Constantino Miguel Filho (born June 14, 1959) is a Brazilian psychiatrist.  He is a graduate of the Faculdade de Medicina da Universidade de São Paulo (FMUSP, University of São Paulo School of Medicine). He currently holds the title of Full Professor and is the Vice-Head of the FMUSP Department of Psychiatry. He is also an Adjunct Associate Professor at Duke University (Durham, NC) and at Yale University (New Haven, CT), as well as being a Research Consultant for Harvard University School of Medicine Massachusetts General Hospital.
Miguel has authored or co-authored more than 150 articles published in journals indexed for the major international databases. Since 2004, he has coordinated the Consórcio Brasileiro de Pesquisa dos Transtornos do Espectro Obsessivo-Compulsivo (Brazilian Consortium for Research on Obsessive-Compulsive Disorder). He is a researcher for the Fundação de Amparo à Pesquisa do Estado de São Paulo (FAPESP, São Paulo Research Foundation) and is the recipient of a 1B Research Productivity Grant from the Brazilian Conselho Nacional de Desenvolvimento Científico e Tecnológico (CNPq, National Council for Scientific and Technological Development). He is also the Director of the multicenter Instituto Nacional de Psiquiatria do Desenvolvimento para Infância e Adolescência (INPD, National Institute of Developmental Psychiatry for Children and Adolescents), which was established under the auspices of the Institutos Nacionais de Ciência e Tecnologia (INCT, National Institutes of Science and Technology Program). In the area of obsessive-compulsive disorder (OCD), he is coordinating his third FAPESP-sponsored Program Grant, which is focused on the investigation of neural circuits and biomarkers involved in OCD through the study of behavioral paradigms of fear and anxiety.

Education and academic life

Miguel was born in São Paulo, where in 1977 he graduated from Colégio São Luís, in São Paulo, and went on to FMUSP.   He did his medical residency in psychiatry at the Institute of Psychiatry of the FMUSP Hospital das Clínicas,  as completing an internship in neurology and a specialty program in psychiatric counseling.

He obtained a doctorate in 1992 with a thesis on psychopathological alterations in patients diagnosed with systemic lupus erythematosus, under the guidance of   Valentim Gentil Filho, and  completed a postdoctoral fellowship at Massachusetts General Hospital of the Harvard University School of Medicine.

Miguel was one of the founders of the Obsessive-Compulsive Spectrum Disorders Project Group, which was established in 1994. He   defended a tenure thesis in 2003 on obsessive-compulsive spectrum disorders.

Main research activities

Lines of research
Since 1992, Miguel has worked as a researcher, studying various themes related to obsessive-compulsive disorder, including comorbidities, potentiation of the effects of the medications employed, biological markers, and the neuronal circuits involved in the disease. He recently took charge of the Child and Adolescent Psychiatry Sector of the FMUSP Department of Psychiatry, with the objective of developing the field of child and adolescent psychiatry in Brazil. The focus of his research is on identifying individuals at risk for developing mental disorders, as well as on the development and testing of interventions to prevent such disorders, using developmental psychiatry as the point of reference.

INPD
Miguel currently coordinates the Instituto Nacional de Psiquiatria do Desenvolvimento para Infância e Adolescência (INPD, National Institute of Developmental Psychiatry for Children and Adolescents). Created in 2008, the INPD conducts research aimed at expanding knowledge in the area,4 within which the new paradigm is promoting mental health and protecting individuals who are vulnerable to psychiatric disorders. 
International collaborations

International collaborations
Miguel has an extensive history of collaboration with researchers working in countries other than Brazil, especially the United States. Such researchers include David Pauls, Michael Jenike, Scott Rauch, and Darin Dougherty, all of Harvard University, as well as James Leckman of Yale University.

Promotion to Full Professor and Head of the FMUSP Department of Psychiatry
In 2009, Miguel simultaneously assumed the title of Full Professor and became the Head of the FMUSP Department of Psychiatry, holding the latter position from 2010 to 2014. He is currently the vice-head of the department.

Awards
In 2012, Miguel received the 54th Jabuti Prize for Literature in the area of medical sciences for his book Clínica Psiquiátrica - A Visão do Departamento e do Instituto de Psiquiatria do HCFMUSP (“Clinical Psychiatry - The Vision of the Department and Institute of Psychiatry of the FMUSP Hospital das Clínicas”). In two consecutive years (2005 and 2006), Miguel received the Prof. Ulysses Vianna Filho Award from the Brazilian Association of Psychiatry. In 2005, he also received the 5th Psychiatry Week Award from the Brazilian Revista de Psiquiatria Clínica (Journal of Clinical Psychiatry). In 2005, he was honored by the Scientific Committee of the FMUSP Hospital das Clínicas Laboratories for Medical Research, receiving the Antonino dos Santos Rocha Award.   At two consecutive meetings of the World Congress of Psychiatry (in 1995 and 1996), Miguel and the Brazilian Association of Biological Psychiatry were honored jointly for their contribution to the study of obsessive-compulsive disorder.

Major publications

Books
TORRES AR, SHAVITT RG, MIGUELEC. Medos, dúvidas e manias: orientações para pessoas com transtorno obsessivo-compulsivo e seus familiares. Porto Alegre : Artmed, 2013.

HOUNIE AG, MIGUEL EC. Tiques, cacoetes, Sindrome de Tourette. Um Manual para Pacientes, seus familiares, educadores e profissionais de saúde (2ª edição). ,Porto Alegre : Artmed, 2012.

MIGUEL EC, GENTIL FILHO V, GATTAZ W F. Clinica Psiquiátrica (2 volumes). Barueri, SP : Manole, 2011.

OLIVEIRA IR, ROSÁRIO MC, MIGUEL EC. Princípios e Prática em Transtorno Obsessivo- Compulsivo. Rio de Janeiro : Guanabara Koogan, 2007

LAFER B, ALMEIDA OP, FRÁGUAS JR, R,MIGUEL EC. Depressão no ciclo da vida. PortoAlegre: Artes Médicas Sul; 2000.

MIGUEL EC, RAUCH S, LECKMAN J.Neuropsychiatry of Basal Ganglia. Psychiatric Clinics of North America. Philadelphia: WB Saunders;20 (4); 1997.

References

1959 births
Brazilian psychiatrists
University of São Paulo alumni
Living people
People from São Paulo
21st-century Brazilian physicians
20th-century Brazilian physicians